The 1974 All-Ireland Under-21 Hurling Championship was the 11th staging of the All-Ireland Under-21 Hurling Championship since its establishment by the Gaelic Athletic Association in 1964. The championship began on 24 April 1974 and ended on 8 September 1974.

Cork entered the championship as the defending champions, however, they were defeated by Clare in the Munster semi-final.

On 8 September 1974, Kilkenny won the championship following a 3-08 to 3-07 defeat of Waterford in the All-Ireland final at Semple Stadium. This was their first All-Ireland title.

Kilkenny's Billy Fitzpatrick and Waterford's Tom Casey were the championship's joint top scorers.

Results

Leinster Under-21 Hurling Championship

Quarter-final

Semi-finals

Final

Munster Under-21 Hurling Championship

First round

Semi-finals

Final

Ulster Under-21 Hurling Championship

Final

All-Ireland Under-21 Hurling Championship

Semi-finals

Final

Championship statistics

Top scorers

Overall

Miscellaneous

 Waterford won the Munster Championship for the first time in their history.
 The All-Ireland final between Kilkenny and Waterford was their first ever championship meeting.

References

Under
All-Ireland Under-21 Hurling Championship